Mielziner is a surname. Notable people with the surname include:

 Jo Mielziner (1901–1976), American theatrical scenic, and lighting designer
 Leo Mielziner (1869–1935), American portrait artist, son of Moses
 Moses Mielziner (1828–1903), American Reform rabbi and author
 Saul Mielziner, American football player